Kittipoom Paphunga (born December 25, 1986) is a former professional footballer from Thailand.

Personal life

Kittipoom's brother Kittipol Paphunga is also a footballer.

Match fixing scandal and ban
On February 21, 2017 Kittipoom was accused of match-fixing on several league games. He was arrested by royal thai police and banned from football for life.

Honours

Club
Chula United
 Regional League Division 2 Champions (1) : 2006

Air Force Central
 Thai Division 1 League Champions (1) : 2013

References

External links
 Goal.com

1986 births
Living people
Kittipoom Paphunga
Kittipoom Paphunga
Association football forwards
Kittipoom Paphunga
Kittipoom Paphunga
Kittipoom Paphunga
Kittipoom Paphunga
Kittipoom Paphunga
Kittipoom Paphunga
Kittipoom Paphunga
Kittipoom Paphunga